The Vorotan, or Bargushad or Bazarchay, is a river in Transcaucasia that is the largest right tributary of the Hakari river. The river originates in the mountains of Azerbaijan's Kalbajar District and flows into Armenia's Syunik Province. The river enters Azerbaijan again, flowing for  through the districts of Qubadli and Zangilan. The lower section of the Hakari, from its confluence with the Vorotan until its confluence with the Aras river, is sometimes considered to be part of the Vorotan.

Course of the river
The river flows mostly through mountainous country and in several places has formed deep canyons. The towns of Sisian and Qubadli lie along its course. Six kilometers from Sisian, the river forms a waterfall — the "Shaki Waterfall" — that is 18m high. The river forms a natural monument — the "Devil's Bridge" — near Tatev Monastery. There are mineral pools at the base of the travertine arch.

Damming the river
During the Soviet period, three reservoirs forming the Vorotan Cascade were constructed. They supply Armenia with hydro-electric power and water for irrigation.
To increase the volume of water in Lake Sevan, a  tunnel was constructed to abstract some of the Vorotan's waters and divert them to the lake. 

Begun during the 1980s, work was stopped in 1988, when only  had been completed, because of the outbreak of the First Nagorno-Karabakh War. The Armenian government finally completed the Vorotan tunnel in 2003. Prior to this, a second tunnel — "Arpa–Sevan" — was completed in 1981. This diverts some water from the Arpa River for Lake Sevan. The waters coming through the two tunnels has resulted in the lake's water level rising.

Gallery

References 

Rivers of Armenia
Rivers of Azerbaijan
International rivers of Europe
International rivers of Asia
Geography of Syunik Province
Qubadli District